The Development Team Giant–Shimano was a Swedish UCI Continental cycling team that existed only for the 2014 season. It served as a development team for the UCI WorldTeam of the same name, .

Team roster

References

UCI Continental Teams (Europe)
Cycling teams based in Sweden
Cycling teams established in 2014
Cycling teams disestablished in 2014